Cytokine receptors are receptors that bind to cytokines.

In recent years, the cytokine receptors have come to demand the attention of more investigators than cytokines themselves, partly because of their remarkable characteristics, and partly because a deficiency of cytokine receptors has now been directly linked to certain debilitating immunodeficiency states. In this regard, and also because the redundancy and pleiotropy of cytokines are a consequence of their homologous receptors, many authorities are now of the opinion that a classification of cytokine receptors would be more clinically and experimentally useful.

Classification
A classification of cytokine receptors based on their three-dimensional structure has been attempted. (Such a classification, though seemingly cumbersome, provides several unique perspectives for attractive pharmacotherapeutic targets.)

 Type I cytokine receptors, whose members have certain conserved motifs in their extracellular amino-acid domain. The IL-2 receptor belongs to this chain, whose γ-chain (common to several other cytokines) deficiency is directly responsible for the x-linked form of Severe Combined Immunodeficiency (X-SCID).
 Type II cytokine receptors, whose members are receptors mainly for interferons.
 Immunoglobulin (Ig) superfamily, which are ubiquitously present throughout several cells and tissues of the vertebrate body
 Tumor necrosis factor receptor family, whose members share a cysteine-rich common extracellular binding domain, and includes several other non-cytokine ligands like receptors, CD40, CD27 and CD30, besides the ligands on which the family is named (TNF).
 Chemokine receptors, two of which acting as binding proteins for HIV (CXCR4 and CCR5). They are G protein coupled receptors.
 TGF-beta receptor family, which are Serine/threonine kinase receptors. Includes the TGF beta receptors

Comparison

Solubility
Cytokine receptors may be both membrane-bound and soluble. Soluble cytokine receptors are extremely common regulators of cytokine function. Soluble cytokine receptors typically consist of the extracellular portions of membrane-bound receptors. .

See also
 STAT protein

References

External links
Cytokine-cytokine receptor interaction map from KEGG